Saint-Cyr Ngam Ngam (born 27 January 1993) is a Central African footballer who plays as a right-back for DFC8 and the Central African Republic national team.

Club career
Ngam Ngam debuted with the Central African Republic national team in a 4–0 2017 Africa Cup of Nations qualification loss to Angola on 13 June 2015.

References

External links
 
 

1993 births
Living people
People from Bangui
Central African Republic footballers
Central African Republic international footballers
Association football fullbacks
Gabon Championnat National D1 players
Elite One players
Central African Republic expatriate footballers
Central African Republic expatriate sportspeople in Gabon
Expatriate footballers in Gabon
Central African Republic expatriate sportspeople in Cameroon
Expatriate footballers in Cameroon